Antioch on the Orontes (Antiókheia hē epì Oróntou, Learned ) was a Hellenistic city founded by Seleucus I Nicator in 300 BC. The city served as the capital of the Seleucid Empire and later as regional capital to both the Roman and Byzantine Empire. During the Crusades, Antioch served as the capital of the Principality of Antioch, one of four Crusader states that were founded in the Levant. Its inhabitants were known as Antiochenes. The modern city of Antakya, in Hatay Province of Turkey, was named after the ancient city, which lies in ruins on the Orontes River and did not overlap in habitation with the modern city.

Antioch was founded near the end of the fourth century BC by Seleucus I Nicator, one of Alexander the Great's generals, as one of the four cities of the Seleucis of Syria. The city's location offered geographical, military, and economic benefits to its occupants; Antioch was heavily involved in the spice trade and lay within easy reach of the Silk Road and the Royal Road. During the late Hellenistic period and Middle Roman Empire, Antioch's population may have reached a peak of over 500,000 inhabitants (most generally estimate between 200,000–250,000), making the city the third largest in the Empire after Rome and Alexandria and one of the most important cities in the eastern Mediterranean. The city was the capital of the Seleucid Empire from 240 BC until 63 BC, when the Romans took control, making it capital of the province of Syria and later of Coele Syria. From the early fourth century, Antioch was the seat of the Count of the Orient, head of the Diocese of the East. The Romans provided the city with walls that covered almost , of which one quarter was mountain, leaving  – about one-fifth the area of Rome within the Aurelian Walls.

The city was also the main center of Hellenistic Judaism at the end of the Second Temple period. Antioch was part of the pentarchy and was called "the cradle of Christianity" as a result of its longevity and the pivotal role that it played in the emergence of early Christianity. The Christian New Testament asserts that the name "Christian" first emerged in Antioch. The city declined to relative insignificance during the Middle Ages due to warfare, repeated earthquakes, and a change in trade routes. The city still lends its name to Greek Orthodox Patriarchate of Antioch, one of the most important churches of the Levant and eastern Mediterranean.

The city is sacred for Muslims who visit the Habib-i Najjar Mosque, the site containing the tomb of Habib the Carpenter, mentioned in Surah Yā-Sīn of the Koran.

Geography
Two routes from the Mediterranean Sea, lying through the Orontes river gorge and the Belen Pass, converge in the plain of the Antioch Lake, now called Lake Amik, and are met there by
the road from the Amanian Gate (Baghche Pass) and western Kingdom of Commagene, which descends the valley of the Karasu to the Afrin River,
the roads from eastern Commagene and the Euphratean crossings at Samosata (now Samsat) and Apamea Zeugma (Birejik), which descend the valleys of the Afrin and the Queiq, and
the road from the Euphratean ford at Thapsacus, which skirts the fringe of the Syrian steppe. A single route proceeds south in the Orontes valley.

History

Prehistory
The settlement called Meroe pre-dated Antioch. A shrine of the Semitic goddess Anat, called by Herodotus the "Persian Artemis", was located here. This site was included in the eastern suburbs of Antioch. There was a village on the spur of Mount Silpius named Io, or Iopolis. This name was always adduced as evidence by Antiochenes (e.g. Libanius) anxious to affiliate themselves to the Attic Ionians—an eagerness which is illustrated by the Athenian types used on the city's coins. Io may have been a small early colony of trading Greeks (Javan). John Malalas also mentions an archaic village, Bottia, in the plain by the river.

Foundation by Seleucus I
Alexander the Great is said to have camped on the site of Antioch and dedicated an altar to Zeus Bottiaeus; it lay in the northwest of the future city. This account is found only in the writings of Libanius, a fourth-century orator from Antioch, and may be legend intended to enhance Antioch's status. But the story is not unlikely in itself.

After Alexander's death in 323 BCE, his generals, the Diadochi, divided up the territory he had conquered. After the Battle of Ipsus in 301 BCE, Seleucus I Nicator won the territory of Syria, and he proceeded to found four "sister cities" in northwestern Syria, one of which was Antioch, a city named in honor of his father Antiochus; according to the Suda, it might be named after his son Antiochus. He is reputed to have built sixteen Antiochs.

Seleucus founded Antioch on a site chosen through ritual means. An eagle, the bird of Zeus, had been given a piece of sacrificial meat and the city was founded on the site to which the eagle carried the offering. Seleucus did this on the 22nd day of the month of Artemísios in the twelfth year of his reign, equivalent to May 300 BCE. Antioch soon rose above Seleucia Pieria to become the Syrian capital.

Hellenistic age
The original city of Seleucus was laid out in imitation of the grid plan of Alexandria by the architect Xenarius. Libanius describes the first building and arrangement of this city (i. p. 300. 17).

The citadel was on Mount Silpius and the city lay mainly on the low ground to the north, fringing the river. Two great colonnaded streets intersected in the centre. Shortly afterwards a second quarter was laid out, probably on the east and by Antiochus I Soter, which, from an expression of Strabo, appears to have been the native, as contrasted with the Greek, town. It was enclosed by a wall of its own.

In the Orontes, north of the city, lay a large island, and on this Seleucus II Callinicus began a third walled "city", which was finished by Antiochus III the Great. A fourth and last quarter was added by Antiochus IV Epiphanes (175–164 BC); thenceforth Antioch was known as Tetrapolis. This area included many large gardens.

The new city was populated by a mix of local settlers that Athenians brought from the nearby city of Antigonia, Macedonians, and Jews (who were given full status from the beginning). According to ancient tradition, Antioch was settled by 5,500 Athenians and Macedonians, together with an unknown number of native Syrians. This number probably refers to free adult citizens, so that the total number of free Greek settlers including women and children was probably between 17,000 and 25,000.

A companion sanctuary of Hecate was constructed underground by Diocletian. The beauty and the lax morals of Daphne were celebrated all over the ancient world; and indeed Antioch as a whole shared in both these titles to fame.

Antioch became the capital and court-city of the western Seleucid Empire under Antiochus I, its counterpart in the east being Seleucia; but its paramount importance dates from the battle of Ancyra (240 BC), which shifted the Seleucid centre of gravity from Anatolia, and led indirectly to the rise of Pergamon.

The Seleucids reigned from Antioch. We know little of it in the Hellenistic period, apart from Syria, all our information coming from authors of the late Roman time. Among its great Greek buildings we hear only of the theatre, of which substructures still remain on the flank of Silpius, and of the royal palace, probably situated on the island. It enjoyed a reputation for being "a populous city, full of most erudite men and rich in the most liberal studies", but the only names of distinction in these pursuits during the Seleucid period that have come down to us are Apollophanes, the Stoic, and one Phoebus, a writer on dreams. The nicknames which they gave to their later kings were Aramaic; and, except Apollo and Daphne, the great divinities of north Syria seem to have remained essentially native, such as the "Persian Artemis" of Meroe and Atargatis of Hierapolis Bambyce.

The epithet "Golden" suggests that the external appearance of Antioch was impressive, but the city needed constant restoration owing to the seismic disturbances to which the district has always been subjected. The first great earthquake in recorded history was related by the native chronicler John Malalas. It occurred in 148 BC and did immense damage.

Local politics were turbulent. In the many dissensions of the Seleucid house the population took sides, and frequently rose in rebellion, for example against Alexander Balas in 147 BC, and Demetrius II Nicator in 129 BC. The latter, enlisting a body of Jews, punished his capital with fire and sword. In the last struggles of the Seleucid house, Antioch turned against its feeble rulers, invited Tigranes the Great to occupy the city in 83 BC, tried to unseat Antiochus XIII Asiaticus in 65 BC, and petitioned Rome against his restoration in the following year. Antioch's wish prevailed, and it passed with Syria to the Roman Republic in 64 BC, but remained a civitas libera.

Roman period

The Roman emperors favored the city from the first moments, seeing it as a more suitable capital for the eastern part of the empire than Alexandria could be, because of the isolated position of Egypt. To a certain extent they tried to make it an eastern Rome. Julius Caesar visited it in 47 BC, and confirmed its freedom. A great temple to Jupiter Capitolinus rose on Silpius, probably at the insistence of Octavian, whose cause the city had espoused. A forum of Roman type was laid out. Tiberius built two long colonnades on the south towards Silpius.

Strabo, writing in the reign of Augustus and the first years of Tiberius, states that Antioch is not much smaller than Seleucia and Alexandria; Alexandria had been said by Diodorus Siculus in the mid-1st Century BC to have 300,000 free inhabitants, which would mean that Antioch was about this size in Strabo's time.

Agrippa and Tiberius enlarged the theatre, and Trajan finished their work. Antoninus Pius paved the great east to west artery with granite. A circus, other colonnades and great numbers of baths were built, and new aqueducts to supply them bore the names of Caesars, the finest being the work of Hadrian. The Roman client, King Herod (most likely the great builder Herod the Great), erected a long stoa on the east, and Agrippa (–12 BC) encouraged the growth of a new suburb south of this.

One of the most famous urban additions to Antioch, done by the Romans probably under Augustus when the city had more than half a million inhabitants, was the Circus of Antioch: it was a Roman hippodrome. Used for chariot racing, it was modelled on the Circus Maximus in Rome and other circus buildings throughout the empire.

Zarmanochegas (Zarmarus) a monk of the Sramana tradition of India, according to Strabo and Dio Cassius, met Nicholas of Damascus in Antioch around 13 AD as part of a Mission to Augustus. At Antioch Germanicus died in 19 AD, and his body was burnt in the forum.

An earthquake that shook Antioch in AD 37 caused the emperor Caligula to send two senators to report on the condition of the city. Another quake followed in the next reign.

Titus set up the Cherubim, captured from the Jewish temple, over one of the gates.

In 115 AD, during Trajan's travel there during his war against Parthia, the whole site was convulsed by a huge earthquake. The landscape altered, and the emperor himself was forced to take shelter in the circus for several days. He and his successor restored the city, but the population was reduced to less than 400,000 inhabitants and many sections of the city were abandoned.

Commodus (r. 177–192 AD) had Olympic games celebrated at Antioch.

In 256 AD, the town was suddenly raided by the Persians under Shapur I, and many of the people were slain in the theatre. It was recaptured by the Roman emperor Valerian the following year.

Age of Julian and Valens
When the emperor Julian visited in 362 on a detour to Persia, he had high hopes for Antioch, regarding it as a rival to the imperial capital of Constantinople. Antioch had a mixed pagan and Christian population, which Ammianus Marcellinus implies lived quite harmoniously together. However, Julian's visit began ominously as it coincided with a lament for Adonis, the doomed lover of Aphrodite. Thus, Ammianus wrote, the emperor and his soldiers entered the city not to the sound of cheers but to wailing and screaming.

After being advised that the bones of 3rd-century martyred bishop Babylas were suppressing the oracle of Apollo at Daphne, he made a public-relations mistake in ordering the removal of the bones from the vicinity of the temple. The result was a massive Christian procession. Shortly after that, when the temple was destroyed by fire, Julian suspected the Christians and ordered stricter investigations than usual. He also shut up the chief Christian church of the city, before the investigations proved that the fire was the result of an accident.

Julian found much else about which to criticize the Antiochene; Julian had wanted the empire's cities to be more self-managing, as they had been some 200 years before. However, Antioch's city councilmen showed themselves unwilling to shore up Antioch's food shortage with their own resources, so dependent were they on the emperor. Ammianus wrote that the councilmen shirked their duties by bribing unwitting men in the marketplace to do the job for them.

The city's impiety to the old religion was clear to Julian when he attended the city's annual feast of Apollo. To his surprise and dismay the only Antiochene present was an old priest clutching a goose.

The Antiochenes in turn hated Julian for worsening the food shortage with the burden of his billeted troops, wrote Ammianus. The soldiers were often to be found gorged on sacrificial meat, making a drunken nuisance of themselves on the streets while Antioch's hungry citizens looked on in disgust. The Christian Antiochenes and Julian's pagan Gallic soldiers also never quite saw eye to eye.

Julian's piety was distasteful to the Antiochenes, even to those who kept the old religion. Julian's brand of paganism was very much unique to himself, with little support outside the most educated Neoplatonist circles. The irony of Julian's enthusiasm for large scale animal sacrifice could not have escaped the hungry Antiochenes. Julian gained no admiration for his personal involvement in the sacrifices, only the nickname axeman, wrote Ammianus.

The emperor's high-handed, severe methods and his rigid administration prompted Antiochene lampoons about, among other things, Julian's unfashionably pointed beard.

Julian's successor, Valens, who endowed Antioch with a new forum, including a statue of Valentinian on a central column, reopened the great church of Constantine, which stood until the Persian sack in 538, by Chosroes.

Christianity

Antioch was a chief center of early Christianity during Roman times. The city had a large population of Jewish origin in a quarter called the Kerateion, and so attracted the earliest missionaries. Evangelized by, among others, Peter himself, according to the tradition upon which the  Patriarchate of Antioch still rests its claim for primacy, and later (according to the Acts of the Apostles) by Barnabas and Paul, its converts were the first to be called Christians. This is not to be confused with Antioch in Pisidia, to which Barnabas and Paul later travelled.

Surrounding the city were a number of Greek, Syrian, Armenian, and Latin monasteries. Between 252 and 300 AD, ten assemblies of the church were held at Antioch and it became the seat of one of the five original patriarchates, along with Constantinople, Jerusalem, Alexandria, and Rome (see Pentarchy).

John Chrysostom writes that when Ignatius of Antioch was bishop in the city, the dêmos, probably meaning the number of free adult men and women without counting children and slaves, numbered 200,000. In a letter written in 363, Libanius says the city contains 150,000 anthrôpoi, a word which would ordinarily mean all human beings of any age, sex, or social status, seemingly indicating a decline in the population since the 1st Century. Chrysostom also says in one of his homilies on the Gospel of Matthew, which were delivered between 386 and 393, that in his own time there were 100,000 Christians in Antioch, a figure which may refer to orthodox Christians who belonged to the Great Church as opposed to members of other groups such as Arians and Apollinarians, or to all Christians of any persuasion.

The Maronite Catholic Church's patriarch is called the Patriarch of Antioch and all the East. He currently resides in Bkerke - Lebanon. The Maronites continue the Antiochene liturgical tradition and the use of the Syrian-Aramaic (Syro-Aramaic or Western Aramaic) language in their liturgies.
One of the canonical Eastern Orthodox churches is still called the Greek Orthodox Church of Antioch, although it moved its headquarters from Antioch to Damascus, Syria, several centuries ago, and its prime bishop retains the title "Patriarch of Antioch", somewhat analogous to the manner in which several Popes, heads of the Roman Catholic Church remained "Bishop of Rome" even while residing in Avignon, in present-day France, in the 14th century.

Syriac Orthodox Patriarchate of Antioch and All the East, is an Oriental Orthodox Church with autocephalous patriarchate founded by Saint Peter and Saint Paul in the 1st century, according to its tradition. The Syriac Orthodox Church is part of Oriental Orthodoxy, a distinct communion of churches claiming to continue the patristic and Apostolic Christology before the schism following the Council of Chalcedon in 451.

Theodosius and after
In 387 AD, there was a great sedition caused by a new tax levied by order of Theodosius I, and the city was punished by the loss of its metropolitan status. Theodosius placed Antioch under Constantinople's rule when he divided the Roman Empire.

Antioch and its port, Seleucia Pieria, were severely damaged by the great earthquake of 526. Seleucia Pieria, which was already fighting a losing battle against continual silting, never recovered. Justinian I renamed Antioch Theopolis ("City of God") and restored many of its public buildings, but the destructive work was completed in 540 by the Persian king, Khosrau I, who deported the population to a newly-built city in Persian Mesopotamia, Weh Antiok Khosrow. Antioch lost as many as 300,000 people. Justinian I made an effort to revive it, and Procopius describes his repairing of the walls; but its glory was past.

During the Byzantine–Sassanid War of 602–628 the Emperor Heraclius confronted the invading Persian army of Khosrow II outside Antioch in 613. The Byzantines were defeated by forces under the generals Shahrbaraz and Shahin Vahmanzadegan at the Battle of Antioch, after which the city fell to the Sassanians, together with much of Syria and eastern Anatolia.

Antioch gave its name to a certain school of Christian thought, distinguished by literal interpretation of the Scriptures and insistence on the human limitations of Jesus. Diodorus of Tarsus and Theodore of Mopsuestia were the leaders of this school. His body was brought to the city and buried in a building erected under the emperor Leo. During the Byzantine era great bathhouses were built in Byzantine centers such as Constantinople and Antioch.

Arab conquest and Byzantine reconquest

In 637, during the reign of the Byzantine emperor Heraclius, Antioch was conquered by the Rashidun Caliphate during the Battle of the Iron Bridge. Since the Umayyad dynasty was unable to penetrate the Anatolian plateau, Antioch found itself on the frontline of the conflicts between two hostile empires during the next 350 years, so that the city went into a precipitous decline.

In 969, the city was recovered for the Byzantine Emperor Nikephoros II Phokas by Michael Bourtzes and the stratopedarches Peter. It soon became the seat of a doux, the civil governor of the homonymous theme, but also the seat of the somewhat more important Domestic of the Schools of the Orient, the supreme military commander of the imperial forces on the eastern frontier. Sometimes both offices were held by the same person, usually military officers such as Nikephoros Ouranos, or Philaretos Brachamios, who managed to retain the integrity of the eastern borderline after the Seljuk conquest of Anatolia. As the empire disintegrated rapidly before the Komnenian restoration, Dux of Antioch & Domestic of the Schools of the East Philaretos Brachamios held the city until Suleiman ibn Qutalmish, the emir of Rum, captured it from him in 1084. Two years later, Suleiman was killed fighting against Tutush, the brother of the Seljuk Sultan, who annexed the city into the Seljuk empire. Yagisiyan was appointed governor and became increasingly independent within the tumultuous years following Malik-Shah's death in 1092.

Crusader era

The Crusaders' Siege of Antioch conquered the city in June 1098 on their way to Jerusalem. At this time, the bulk of far eastern trade traveled through Egypt, but in the second half of the 12th century Nur ed-Din and later Saladin brought order to Muslim Syria, opening up long-distance trade routes, including to Antioch and on to its new port, St Symeon, which had replaced Seleucia Pieria. However, the Mongol conquests of the 13th century altered the main trade routes from the far east, as they encouraged merchants to take the overland route through Mongol territory to the Black Sea, reducing the prosperity of Antioch.

In 1100, Tancred became the regent of Antioch after his uncle and predecessor Bohemond I of Antioch was taken prisoner for three years (1100–03) by Gazi Gümüshtigin of the Danishmends at the Battle of Melitene. Tancred expanded the territory of Antioch by conquering Byzantine Cilicia, Tarsus, and Adana in 1101 and founding the principality, Byzantine Latakia, in 1103. In 1107 Bohemond enraged by an earlier defeat when he, allianced with Edessa, attacked Aleppo, and Baldwin of Bourcq and Joscelin of Courtenay (Bourcq's most powerful vassal) were briefly captured, as well as the Byzantines recapturing of Cilicia and the harbor and lower town of Lattakieh, he renamed Tancred as the regent of Antioch and sailed for Europe with the intent of gaining support for an attack against the Greeks.

From 1107 to 1108, Bohemond led a 'crusade' against Byzantium, with the Latins crossing the Adriatic in October 1107 and laying siege to the city of Durrës (in modern Albania), which is often regarded as the western gate of the Greek empire. Bohemond was outwitted by Alexius, who deployed his forces to cut the invaders' supply lines whilst avoiding direct confrontation. The Latins were weakened by hunger and proved unable to break the defenses of Durrës. Bohemond capitulated in September 1108 and was forced to accede to a peace accord, the Treaty of Devol. The terms of this agreement stipulated that Bohemond was to hold Antioch for the remainder of his life as the emperor's subject and the Greek patriarch was to be restored to power in the city. However, Tancred refused to honor the Treaty of Devol in which Bohemond swore an oath, and it is not until 1158 that it truly became a vassal state of the Byzantine Empire. Six months after the Treaty of Devol Bohemond died, and Tancred remained regent of Antioch until his death during a typhoid epidemic in 1112.

After the death of Tancred, the principality passed to Roger of Salerno, who helped rebuild Antioch after an earthquake destroyed its foundations in 1114. With the defeat of Roger's crusading army and his death at the Battle of Ager Sanguinis in 1119 the role of regent was assumed by Baldwin II of Jerusalem, lasting until 1126, with the exception from 1123 to 1124 when he was briefly captured by the Artuqids and held captive alongside Joscelin of Courtenay. In 1126 Bohemond II arrived from Apulia in order to gain regency over Antioch. In February 1130 Bohemond was lured into an ambush by Leo I, Prince of Armenia who allied with the Danishmend Gazi Gümüshtigin, and was killed in the subsequent battle, his head was then embalmed, placed in a silver box, and sent as a gift to the Abbasid caliph in Baghdad.

Antioch was again ruled by a regency, firstly being Baldwin II, after his daughter and Bohemond II's wife, Alice of Antioch attempted to block Baldwin from entering Antioch, but failed when Antiochene nobles such as Fulk of Jerusalem (Alice's brother-in-law) opened up the gates for representatives of Baldwin II. Alice was then expelled from Antioch. With the death of Balwin in 1131, Alice briefly took control of Antioch and allied herself with Pons of Tripoli and Joscelin II of Edessa in an attempt to prevent Fulk, King of Jerusalem from marching north in 1132; however, this attempt failed and Fulk and Pons fought a brief battle before peace was made and Alice was exiled again. In 1133 the king chose Raymond of Poitiers as a groom for Constance of Antioch, daughter of Bohemund II of Antioch and Alice, princess of Jerusalem. The marriage took place in 1136 between the 21-year-old Raymond and the 9-year-old Constance.

Immediately after assuming control, Raymond was involved in conflicts with the Byzantine Emperor John II Comnenus who had come south to recover Cilicia from Leo of Armenia, and to reassert his rights over Antioch. The engagement lasted until 1137 when emperor John II arrived with an army before the walls of Antioch. Although the basileus did not enter the city, his banner was raised atop the citadel and Raymond was compelled to do homage. Raymond agreed with the emperor that if he was capable of capturing Aleppo, Shaizar, and Homs, he would exchange Antioch for them.

John went on to attack Aleppo with the aid of Antioch and Edessa, and failed to capture it, with the Franks withdrawing their support when he moved on to capture Shaizar. John returned to Antioch ahead of his army and entered Antioch, only to be forced to leave when Joscelin II, Count of Edessa rallied the citizens to oust him. In 1142 John then returned but Raymond refused to submit and John was forced to return to Cilicia again due to the coming winter, to plan an attack the following season. However, the emperor died on April 8, 1143.

Second Crusade

The following year after the death of John II Comnenus, Imad ad-Din Zengi lay siege to Edessa, the crusader capital, and with the death of Imad ad-Din Zengi in 1146, he was succeeded by his son, Nur ad-Din Zangi. Zangi attacked Antioch in both 1147 and 1148 and succeeded during the second venture in occupying most of the territory east of the Orontes including Artah, Kafar Latha, Basarfut, and Balat, but failing to capture Antioch itself. With the Second Crusade army previously nearly entirely defeated by the Turks and by sickness, Louis VII of France arrived in Antioch on March 19, 1148, after being delayed by storms. Louis was welcomed by the uncle of his spouse Eleanor of Aquitaine, Raymond of Poitiers.

Louis refused to help Antioch defend against the Turks and to lead an expedition against Aleppo, and instead decided to finish his pilgrimage to Jerusalem rather than focus on the military aspect of the Crusades. With Louis quickly leaving Antioch again and the Crusaders returning home in 1149, Nur ad-Din launched an offensive against the territories which were dominated by the Castle of Harim, situated on the eastern bank of the Orontes, after which Nur besieged the castle of Inab. Raymond of Poitiers quickly came to the aid of the citadel, where he was defeated and killed at the Battle of Inab, Raymond's head was then cut off and sent to Nur, who sent it to the caliph in Baghdad. However, Nur ad-Din did not attack Antioch itself and was content with capturing all of Antiochene territory that lay east of the Orontes.

After the Second Crusade
With Raymond dead and Bohemond III only five years of age, the principality came under the control of Raymond's widow Constance of Antioch; however, real control lay with Aimery of Limoges. In 1152 Baldwin III of Jerusalem came of age, but from 1150 he had proposed three different but respectable suitors for Constance's hand in marriage, all of whom she rejected. In 1153, however, she chose Raynald of Châtillon and married him in secret without consulting her first cousin and liege lord, Baldwin III, and neither Baldwin nor Aimery of Limoges approved of her choice.

In 1156 Raynald claimed that the Byzantine emperor Manuel I Comnenus had reneged on his promises to pay Raynald a sum of money, and vowed to attack the island of Cyprus in revenge. However, Aimery refused to finance Raynald's expedition, so in turn Raynald had the Patriarch seized, beaten, stripped naked, covered in honey, and had him left in the burning sun on top of the citadel to be attacked by insects. When the Patriarch was released, he collapsed in exhaustion and agreed to finance Raynald's expedition.

In the meantime, Raynald had allied himself with the Armenian prince, Thoros II. In 1156 Raynald's forces attacked Cyprus, ravaging the island over a three-week period, with rapine, killing, and plundering its citizens. After which, Manuel I Comnenus raised an army and began their march towards Syria, as a result Raynald threw himself to the mercy of the emperor who insisted on the installation of a Greek Patriarch and the surrender of the citadel in Antioch. The following spring, Manuel made a triumphant entry into the city and established himself as the unquestioned suzerain of Antioch.

In 1160 Raynald was captured by Muslims during a plundering raid against the Syrian and Armenian peasants of the neighborhood of Marash. He was held captive for sixteen years, and as the stepfather of the Empress Maria, he was ransomed by Manuel for 120,000 gold dinars in 1176 (about 500 kg of gold, worth approximately £16 million or US$26 million ). With Raynald disposed of for a long time, the patriarch Aimery became the new regent, chosen by Baldwin III. To further consolidate his own claim over Antioch, Manuel chose Maria of Antioch as his bride, daughter of Constance of Antioch and Raymond of Poitiers. But the government of Antioch remained in crisis up until 1163, when Constance asked the Armenian Kingdom of Cilicia to help maintain her rule, as a result the citizens of Antioch exiled her and installed her son Bohemond III and now brother-in-law to the emperor, as regent.

One year later, Nur ad-Din Zangi captured Bohemond III when he defeated a joint Antiochene-Tripolitan army. Bohemond III was soon released; however, Harem, Syria, which Raynald had recaptured in 1158, was lost again and the frontier of Antioch was permanently placed west of the Orontes. Byzantine influence remained in Antioch and in 1165, Bohemond III married a niece of the emperor, Maria of Antioch, and installed a Greek patriarch in the city, Athanasius II, Patriarch of Antioch, who remained in his position until he died in an earthquake five years later.

Third Crusade
On October 29, 1187, Pope Gregory VIII issued the papal bull Audita tremendi, his call for the Third Crusade. Frederick I Barbarossa, Richard I of England, and Philip II of France answered the summons. With Richard and Philip deciding to take a sea route, Frederick lacked the necessary ships and took a land route where he pushed on through Anatolia, defeating the Turks in the Battle of Iconium; however, upon reaching Christian territory in Lesser Armenia (Armenian Kingdom of Cilicia) the emperor drowned in the river Saleph. The emperor was buried at Antioch and the Germans became an insignificant contingent during the crusade. Throughout the Third Crusade, Antioch remained neutral; however, with the end of the Third Crusade (1192), they were included in the Treaty of Ramla between Richard and Saladin.

Battles for sovereignty
With no heir after the death of Raymond III, Count of Tripoli in the Battle of Hattin he left his godson, Raymond IV, Count of Tripoli, the eldest son of Bohemond III. However, Bohemond installed his younger, the future prince Bohemond IV of Antioch, as count of Tripoli. Shortly after the end of the Third Crusade, Raymond IV, Count of Tripoli married Alice of Armenia, the niece of Leo II, or Leo I, King of Armenia, and a vassal to Antioch. Alice bore Raymond IV a son in 1199, Raymond-Roupen, after which Raymond IV died in the coming months. In 1194 Leo II tricked Bohemond III making him believe that the new born prince had been captured by the Roupenians. Leo made a failed attempt at capturing Antioch believing the city would be weakened with the absence of Bohemond.

Henry II, Count of Champagne nephew to both Richard I and Philip II, travelled to Lesser Armenia and managed to persuade Leo that in exchange for Antioch, renouncing its overlordship to Lesser Armenia and to release Bohemond, who in 1201 died. With the death of Bohemond III there followed a 15-year struggle for power of Antioch, between Tripoli and Lesser Armenia. According to the rules of primogeniture Leo's great nephew Raymond-Roupen was the rightful heir of Antioch, and Leo's position was supported by the pope. On the other hand, however, the city commune of Antioch supported Bohemond IV of Antioch, on the grounds that he was the closest blood relative to the last ruling prince, Bohemond III. In 1207 Bohemond IV installed a Greek patriarch in Antioch, despite the East–West Schism, under the help of Aleppo, Bohemond IV drove Leo out of Antioch.

Fifth Crusade and afterwards

In 1213 Pope Innocent III's papal bull Quia maior called for all of Christendom to lead a new (Fifth) crusade. This strengthened the support of sultan al-Adil I, an Ayyubid-Egyptian general who supported Raymond-Roupen's claims in Antioch. Bohemond IV and his son Bohemond V remained neutral in the struggles of the Guelphs and Ghibellines to the south which arose when Frederich II married Isabella II, and in 1233 Bohemond IV died.

From 1233 onwards Antioch declined and appeared rarely in records for 30 years, and in 1254 the altercations of the past between Antioch and Armenia were laid to rest when Bohemond VI of Antioch married the then 17‑year‑old Sibylla of Armenia, and Bohemond VI became a vassal of the Armenian kingdom. Effectively, the Armenian kings ruled Antioch while the prince of Antioch resided in Tripoli. The Armenians drew up a treaty with the Mongols, who were now ravaging Muslim lands, and under protection they extended their territory into the lands of the Seljuq dynasty in the north and the Aleppo territory to the south. Antioch was part of this Armeno-Mongol alliance. Bohemond VI managed to retake Lattakieh and reestablished the land bridge between Antioch and Tripoli, while the Mongols insisted he install the Greek patriarch there rather than a Latin one, due to the Mongols attempting to strengthen ties with the Byzantine Empire. This earned Bohemond the enmity of the Latins of Acre, and Bohemond was excommunicated by the Patriarch of Jerusalem, Pope Urban IV, which was later suspended.

Fall of Antioch

In 1259 the Mongols captured the Syrian city of Damascus, and eventually in 1260, Aleppo. The Mamluk sultan Saif ad-Din Qutuz looked to ally with the Franks, who declined. In September 1260, the Mamluks defeated the Mongols at the Battle of Ain Jalut, shortly after Qutuz was assassinated at Al-Salihiyya, and according to various sources his successor Baibars was involved in his murder. (Baibars "came to power with [the] regicide [of Qutuz] on his conscience" according to Tschanz.) Despite this, Baibars was named sultan, and in 1263 sacked Nazareth, threatened Antioch with invasion, and appeared before the walls of Acre. In January 1265, Baibars launched an offensive against the Latins, starting with Acre, the capital of the remnant of the Kingdom of Jerusalem, but was unable to take it. He nevertheless defeated the Crusaders in many other battles in Arsuf, Athlith, Haifa, and so on. In 1268, Baibars besieged Antioch, capturing the city on May 18. Baibars promised to spare the lives of the inhabitants, but broke his promise and razed the city, killing or enslaving nearly the entire population upon their surrender.

Antioch's ruler, Prince Bohemond VI was then left with no territories except the County of Tripoli. Without any southern fortifications and with Antioch isolated it could not withstand the onslaught of resurgent Muslim forces, and with the fall of the city, the remainder of northern Syria eventually capitulated, ending the Latin presence in Syria. The Mamluk armies killed or enslaved every Christian in Antioch. In 1355 it still had a considerable population, but by 1432 there were only about 300 inhabited houses within its walls, mostly occupied by Turcomans.

Ottoman Period
Antioch was incorporated into the Ottoman Empire with the conquest of Syria in 1516. It formed a sub-province (sancak) or tax collectorship (muhassıllık) of the province of Aleppo (Aleppo Eyalet). Beginning in the mid-18th century, the district witnessed an influx of Alawite settlers coming from the Latakia area. The famous Barker family of British consuls had a summer home in Suwaydiyya (today's Samandağ), at the mouth of the Orontes River, in the 19th century. Between 1831 and 1840, Antioch was the military headquarters of Ibrahim Pasha of Egypt during the Egyptian occupation of Syria, and served as a model site for the modernizing reforms he wished to institute.

Archaeology

Few traces of the once great Roman city are visible today aside from the massive fortification walls that snake up the mountains to the east of the modern city, several aqueducts, and the Church of St Peter (St Peter's Cave Church, Cave-Church of St. Peter), said to be a meeting place of an Early Christian community. The majority of the Roman city lies buried beneath deep sediments from the Orontes River, or has been obscured by recent construction.

Between 1932 and 1939, archaeological excavations of Antioch were undertaken under the direction of the "Committee for the Excavation of Antioch and Its Vicinity", which was made up of representatives from the Louvre Museum, the Baltimore Museum of Art, the Worcester Art Museum, Princeton University, Wellesley College, and later (1936) also the Fogg Art Museum at Harvard University and its affiliate Dumbarton Oaks.

The excavation team failed to find the major buildings they hoped to unearth, including Constantine's Great Octagonal Church or the imperial palace. However, a great accomplishment of the expedition was the discovery of high-quality Roman mosaics from villas and baths in Antioch, Daphne and Seleucia Pieria.

The principal excavations of Mosaics at Antioch led by Princeton University in March 1932 recovered nearly 300 mosaics. Many of these mosaics were originally displayed as floor mosaics in private homes during the 2nd through 6th centuries AD, while others were displayed in baths and other public buildings. The majority of the Antioch mosaics are from the fourth and fifth centuries, Antioch's golden age, though others from earlier times have survived as well
. The mosaics depict a variety of images including animals, plants, and mythological beings, as well as scenes from the daily lives of people living in the area at the time. Each mosaic is bordered by intricate designs and contains bold, vibrant colors.

One mosaic includes a border that depicts a walk from Antioch to Daphne, showing many ancient buildings along the way. The mosaics are now displayed in the Hatay Archaeology Museum in Antakya. A collection of mosaics on both secular and sacred subjects which were once in churches, private homes, and other public spaces now hang in the Princeton University Art Museum and museums of other sponsoring institutions. The non-Islamic coins from the excavations were published by Dorothy B. Waage.

A statue in the Vatican and a number of figurines and statuettes perpetuate the type of its great patron goddess and civic symbol, the Tyche (Fortune) of Antioch – a majestic seated figure, crowned with the ramparts of Antioch's walls and holding wheat stalks in her right hand, with the river Orontes as a youth swimming under her feet. According to William Robertson Smith the Tyche of Antioch was originally a young virgin sacrificed at the time of the founding of the city to ensure its continued prosperity and good fortune.

The northern edge of Antakya has been growing rapidly over recent years, and this construction has begun to expose large portions of the ancient city, which are frequently bulldozed and rarely protected by the local museum.

In April 2016, archaeologists discovered a Greek mosaic showing a skeleton lying down with a wine pitcher and loaf of bread alongside a text that reads: "Be cheerful, enjoy your life", it is reportedly from the 3rd century BC. Described as the "reckless skeleton" or "skeleton mosaic", the mosaic is once thought to have belonged in the dining room of an upper-class home.

Notable people
Abba Judan, philanthropist
Arcadius of Antioch, Greek grammarian
Asclepiades of Antioch, Patriarch of Antioch
Saint Barnabas, one of the prominent Christian disciples in Jerusalem
Saint Domnius, Bishop of Salona and patron saint of Split
George of Antioch, the first to hold the office of ammiratus ammiratorum
Ignatius of Antioch, Patriarch of Antioch
John Malalas, a Greek chronicler 
John Chrysostom, (349–407) Patriarch of Constantinople
Libanius, 4th century AD, pagan sophist and confidant of Emperor Julian
Saint Luke, 1st century AD, Christian evangelist and author of the Gospel of St. Luke and Acts of the Apostles
Severus of Antioch, was the Patriarch of Antioch, and the head of the Syriac Orthodox Church
Aulus Licinius Archias, Greek poet
Tiberius Claudius Pompeianus, Roman politician and general
Saint Maron, Patriarch of the Maronite Church

See also
Antiochene Rite
Holy Hand Grenade of Antioch from Monty Python
List of Greek place names
The Martyr of Antioch
Theophilus of Antioch

References and sources

Notes

References

Sources

Müller, Karl Otfried (1839). Antiquitates Antiochenae
Freund, Albin (1882). Beiträge zur antiochenischen und zur konstantinopolitanischen Stadtchronik
R. Forster (1897). in Jahrbuch of Berlin Arch. Institute, xii.
Wickert, Ulrich (1999). "Antioch." In The Encyclopedia of Christianity, edited by Erwin Fahlbusch and Geoffrey William Bromiley, 81–82. Vol. 1. Grand Rapids: Wm. B. Eerdmans,

External links

The Ancient City of Antioch Map
Richard Stillwell, ed. Princeton Encyclopedia of Classical Sites, 1976: "Antioch on the Orontes (Antaky), Turkey"
Antioch (Antakya) Includes timeline, maps, and photo galleries of Antioch's mosaics and artifacts
Antakya Museum Many photos of the collection in Antakya's museum, in particular Roman mosaics
Antiochepedia Blog News and information about ancient Antioch
Hatay Archaeology Museum website  (mosaics from Antioch)

 01
Ancient Greek cities in Anatolia
Roman towns and cities in Turkey
Populated places along the Silk Road
Former populated places in Turkey
Ancient Greek archaeological sites in Turkey
Archaeological sites in Hatay Province
Coloniae (Roman)
Crusade places
Geography of Hatay Province
Holy cities
New Testament cities
Roman sites in Turkey
Seleucid colonies in Anatolia
Populated places established in the 4th century BC
290s BC establishments
1268 disestablishments
Populated places disestablished in the 13th century